Floriane Chinsky (born 1974 in Paris, France) is the first female rabbi in Belgium. 

In 2005, she was ordained as a rabbi at the Schechter Institute in Jerusalem; the same year she received a Ph.D. in sociology of law, with a thesis studying the social representations of Jewish law in France. She became Belgium's first female rabbi in 2005, at Beth Hillel, Brussels’ Reform congregation. In 2010, she became the rabbi at the Masorti congregation, Neve Shalom, in Saint-Germain-en-Laye, and in 2013, became a rabbi at the Liberal Jewish Movement of France in Paris. She is the third woman to become a rabbi in France.

See also
Timeline of women rabbis

References 

Conservative women rabbis
Reform women rabbis
Living people
1974 births
Conservative rabbis
Belgian rabbis
French Reform rabbis
Rabbis from Paris